is a Japanese fashion model.

Early life 
Mannami was born August 23, 1992, in Mie Prefecture. She was a ballerina until age 18.

Career 
Mannami started her career as a nurse. She was discovered via Instagram when she was 23, and walked in the Fendi show in Tokyo. She has appeared in advertisements for Shiseido, Uniqlo, Givenchy, Gap Inc., Nordstrom, Aldo Shoes, and Bottega Veneta. Mannami has appeared in magazines including Teen Vogue, Harper's Bazaar Hong Kong, CR Fashion Book, Vogue Italia, and American Vogue.

References 

Living people
1992 births
Japanese female models
Models from Mie Prefecture
The Society Management models
Elite Model Management models